Poplarville is an unincorporated community in northern Manitoba, Canada.

References 

Unincorporated communities in Northern Region, Manitoba